Billy Mack Ham (February 4, 1937 – June 20, 2016) was an American music impresario, best known as the manager, producer, and image-maker for the blues-rock band ZZ Top. Ham also gained prominence in the country music world by discovering and managing multi-platinum singer-songwriter Clint Black and founding some of the most successful country music publishing companies. For several years in the 1990s, Ham's companies published a majority of the top-10 country music singles.

Biography

Childhood
Ham was born in Waxahachie, Texas on Feb. 4, 1937. His first involvement with the music industry was as a recording artist for Dot Records, which released a solo album produced by Pat Boone.

Career
The band which eventually became ZZ Top started as the "Moving Sidewalks."  When Tom Moore and Don Summers left, Dan Mitchell and Billy Gibbons changed the name to ZZ Top. Lanier Greig was added and the original ZZ Top was formed. Later, Dusty Hill and Frank Beard replaced Greig and Mitchell respectively and the band achieved success as a trio consisting of Gibbons, Hill and Beard.

Ham was working as a record promotion man for H. W. Daily Distributing when he saw the Sidewalks perform at a Doors concert in Houston and came backstage to compliment the band. Later when the Sidewalks decided to fire their manager, Mitchell asked Ham if he would be interested in serving in that capacity.

Ham was instrumental to ZZ Top's success, co-writing songs, producing their hit albums, and constructing their image, and continuing as the band's manager up to and including 1996's Rhythmeen album and tour. He also recruited Texas guitarist and singer/songwriter Jay Boy Adams into the ZZ Top family. Adams was the second artist produced and managed by Ham. Adams would tour extensively with ZZ Top throughout the seventies and early eighties and served as the band's first regular support act and roadie. Austin, Texas guitarist Van Wilks was also a part of Bill Ham's Lone Wolf Productions throughout the years and toured with ZZ Top on many occasions. Austin, Texas guitarist and music producer Jay Aaron was also a part of Bill Ham's Lone Wolf Productions, and recorded a solo album in 1990 for Warner Bros. Records, with Bill Ham as executive producer. Years earlier Jay Aaron produced and engineered Eric Johnson's Seven Worlds album, also with Bill Ham as executive producer.

Lone Wolf Productions has also produced such artists as Clint Black, Eric Johnson, Jay Aaron, and Point Blank.

Murder of his wife
On July 2, 1991, 48-year-old Cecile Ham (née Autrey) was in a Walgreens parking lot when she was attacked by 22-year-old Spencer Corey Goodman, a recently paroled repeat offender. Goodman knocked her unconscious before stealing her red 1991 Cadillac. He later pulled over and used "martial arts" to break Cecile's neck, killing her. He then dumped her body in a field before fleeing in the stolen car. A friend of Cecile reported her missing the next day.

Goodman was apprehended five weeks later following a high-speed chase and crashing the stolen car. Goodman was ultimately convicted of the murder and sentenced to death. He was executed by lethal injection on January 18, 2000, aged 31; Ham himself was present at the event. Goodman is buried at Captain Joe Byrd Cemetery.

Death
Ham died on June 20, 2016, at his home in Austin, Texas, according to the Travis County Medical Examiner's Office. No cause of death was given. He was 79.

References

External links

 Bill Ham biography on mp3.com
 Info on famoustexans.com
 

1937 births
2016 deaths
Record producers from Texas
People from Waxahachie, Texas
ZZ Top